David C. Fields (born January 13, 1937) is an American diplomat. He was the United States Ambassador to the Central African Republic from 1986 to 1989 and the Marshall Islands from 1992 to 1995. He was also the second Director of the Office of Foreign Missions at the Department of State.

Biography
David C. Fields was born in 1937. He later joined the United States Foreign Service. On October 16, 1986, Fields was appointed as the United States Ambassador to the Central African Republic, and presented his credentials to Central African president André Kolingba on December 4, 1986. He left that post on October 3, 1989. On March 8, 1990, Fields was appointed as Director of the Office of Foreign Missions and assumed duty on March 12, 1990. On July 22, 1992, Fields left that position upon his appointment as United States Ambassador to the Marshall Islands on July 7, 1992. Harry W. Porter III served as Acting Director of the Office of Foreign Missions from July 1992 to May 1993 until Eric J. Boswell assumed the office.

On August 19, 1992, Fields presented his credentials to Marshallese president Amata Kabua and formally commenced his ambassadorship; he was succeeded by Joan M. Plaisted and left the post on May 15, 1995.

David C. Fields currently resides in California.

References

Ambassadors of the United States to the Marshall Islands
Ambassadors of the United States to the Central African Republic
1937 births
Living people
United States Foreign Service personnel
20th-century American diplomats
Directors of the Office of Foreign Missions